William Collier may refer to:

 William Collier Jr. (1902–1987), American actor
 William Collier Sr. (1864–1944), American writer, director and actor
 William Collier (colonist) (c. 1585–1671), English settler in Massachusetts
 William Collier (MP), MP for Truro, 1713–15, and manager of the Drury Lane Theatre
 William Collier (footballer) (1890–?), Scottish footballer, played for Scotland in 1922
 William Miller Collier (1867–1956), American diplomat

See also 
 William Collier Smithers (1795–1861), English author